John Trim may refer to:
 John Trim (cricketer)
 John Trim (linguist)